Me to You Bears (also known as Tatty Teddies) is the brand name of a collection of teddy bears made by the Carte Blanche Greetings Ltd. They are often found in Clinton Cards. They were first created in 1987 and appeared in their current guise in 1995. A number of products are available related to Tatty Teddy including plush toys, figurines, cards, mugs, and wedding accessories.

Origin
The beginnings of Me to You started in 1987 when Carte Blanche Greetings chairman and Founder, Stephen Haines, approached Mike Payne to create a group of 'cute' characters to appear on a series of greeting cards. This led to the creation of various cartoon animals called the Miranda gang, which notably included a brown bear with patches.

Deciding it was time for a refresh, in 1995 Carte Blanche gave the bear a new look. Drawn in charcoal pencil turning the bear from brown to grey, and with the addition of a bright blue nose, a few more patches and a story of his very own 'Tatty Teddy' and 'Me to You' were born. 
Me to You is now a global brand and Tatty Teddy now appears on a wide range of Me to You products including greeting cards, plush, clothing, gifts, figurines, personalised products and confectionery. Over 75 million Me to You plush bears have been sold since 2000.

Availability
First only available in the UK, it was announced in December 2011 that the Douglas Company received a license to sell the brand in the US and Canada.

Appearance
The first generation of Tatty Teddy soft toys, produced in 2000, was based on the original greeting card design of 1995 consisting of a teddy bear with short grey fur, small black eyes, an off-white snout and a blue nose with a white reflective spot on the right hand side. They also have patches of a light grey colour which appear to have been sewn onto them, along with stitching repair work on the arms and head, hence the name 'tatty'.  The words 'Me to You' are embroidered on the right rear paw. The very first Tatty Teddy was hand crafted by Linda Laverty of Worthing, West Sussex. The second generation Tatty Teddy, introduced in 2003, kept to the same overall design but with much finer fur.  To coincide with the 2003 redesign, the 'Me to You' story was also published, describing how the teddy bear came to be in its current state.  A third generation Tatty Teddy was introduced in May 2009.  This bear has much longer fur in various shades of grey and a blue plastic nose, rather than the fabric nose on previous generations.  The reflective spot has been removed since the new plastic nose has reflective qualities.

The bears come in many different sizes, ranging from 5 cm to in excess of 80 cm, and often come with accessories such as hearts, roses, T-shirts, wooly hats and scarves. Some have personalised messages from a simple "I Love You" to longer seasonal and event related messages. It is even possible for customers to personalise their bears. The bears are particularly popular amongst females in the 10–30 age group although they are also designed to be romantic gifts for people of all ages as they can be considered 'cute'. Due to this they are becoming collectors items, similar to Steiff and Beanie Baby toys. Indeed, there are even annual Tatty Teddy national collectors events.

Several special edition and limited edition bears have also been produced, enhancing the collectible nature of the toys, which see the bear dressed in different costumes including various animals and the four seasons (summer, winter etc.).  Many of the limited and special edition releases are designed to tie in with events such as Valentine's Day, Mother's Day and Christmas.  The number of these limited edition bears produced is usually 9000, however this can range from 1500 to in excess of 10,000.

Regional variations of Tatty Teddy are also available, for example Scottish dress and London Beefeater.  Versions of Tatty Teddy have also been made for the tourist market, usually wearing a T-shirt with an expressive message, for example 'I Love Cornwall'.

The makers of the teddies do not recommend that they are cleaned in washing machines but instead should be hand washed. This is because the dye in the clothes of the bears has not been tested to see if they are colorfast.

Backstory
(wip)

My Blue Nose Friends: Series 1
In the summer of 2008, "My Blue Nose Friends" were released – other animal toys in the same style as Tatty Teddy.  The story given is that Tatty Teddy was lonely and dreamt of a wardrobe full of friends.

2008
Set 1 – June 2008
 1 Patch the Dog          
 2 Kittywink the Cat      
 3 Blossom the Rabbit     
 4 Dilly the Duck         
 5 Toots the Elephant
 6 Binky the Panda

Set 2 – August 2008
 7 Twiggy the Giraffe
 8 Chip the Zebra
 9 Rocky the Lion
 10 Buster the Leopard

Set 3 – October 2008
 11 Truffles the Pig
 12 Cottonsocks the Sheep
 13 Coco the Monkey
 14 Konker the Hedgehog

Set 4 – December 2008
 15 Chalky the polar bear
 16 Wise the Owl
 17 Chilly the Penguin
 18 Jingle the Reindeer

2009
Set 5 – January 2009
 19 Mo the Kangaroo
 20 Gumgum the Koala
 21 Milkshake the Cow
 22 Bobbin the Horse

Set 6 – May 2009
 23 Thomas the Hippopotamus
 24 Digger the Terrier
 25 Bracken the Badger
 26 Dot the Ladybird

Limited Edition 1 – June 2009
 27 Breeze the Butterfly

Set 7 – August 2009
 28 Honey the Bee
 29 Splodge the Dalmatian
 30 Shelley the Turtle
 31 Lily the Frog

Limited Edition 2 – September 2009
 32 Echo the Bat

Set 8 – November 2009
 33 Bells the Reindeer
 34 Sugarcube the Donkey
 35 Tiny the Mouse
 36 Jock the Moose

Limited Edition 3 – December 2009
 37 Ruby the Robin

2010
Set 9 – January 2010
 38 Peanuts the Hamster
 39 Pearl the Poodle
 40 Fluffy the Old English Sheepdog
 41 Snuffle the Anteater
 42 Melody the Parrot
 43 Snowdrop the White Rabbit

Limited Edition 4 – January 2010
 44 Legend the Unicorn

Set 10 – March 2010
 45 Scoot the Snail
 46 Mack the Otter
 47 Zee Zee the Goat
 48 Wrinkles the Boxer Dog
 49 Cuddles the sun bear

Set 11 – June 2010
 50 Giggles the Baboon
 51 Goldie the Golden Labrador
 52 Webster the Spider
 53 Sue-Shee the Pelican

Limited Edition 5 – July 2010
 54 Stilts the Flamingo

Set 12 – August 2010
 55 Whisper the Deer
 56 Blubber the Walrus
 57 Jungle the Orangutan
 58 Essence the Skunk

Set 13 – November 2010
 59 Wanda the Goose
 60 Alaska the Husky
 61 Whiskers the Seal
 62 Kozie the Alpaca

Limited Edition 6 – Christmas 2010
 63 Cranberry the Turkey

2011
Set 14 – January 2011
 Trotters the wild boar
 Cheddar the Field Mouse
 Rainbow the Puffin
 Kashmir the Ram

Limited Edition 7 – Valentine's Day 2011
 Passion the Lovebug

Set 15 – March 2011
 Splash the Octopus
 Peek-a-boo the Mole
 Chase the Jack Russell Terrier
 Midnight the Owl

Limited Edition 8 – June 2011
 Tango the Toucan

Set 16 – June 2011
 Oasis the Camel
 Gossip the Lizard
 Snugs the Chinchilla
 Peers the Meerkat

Set 17 – August 2011
 Baffle the Fox
 Noo the Wildebeest
 Scuba the Dolphin
 Ivory the Rhinoceros

Limited Edition 9 – September 2011
 Flame the Dragon

Set 18 – November 2011
 Needles the woolly mammoth
 Quiver the emperor penguin
 Bengal the White tiger
 Alpine the Bernese Mountain Dog

Limited Edition 10 – November 2011
 Feathers the Peacock

2012
Set 19 – January 2012
 Nutmeg the Squirrel
 Buck the Beaver
 Yabber the Platypus
 Koodoo the Antelope

Limited Edition 11 – January 2012
 Ripple the Swan

Set 20 – March 2012
 Scraps the Rat
 Runner the Ostrich
 Foo the Pug
 Float the Manatee

Limited Edition 12 – April 2012
 Tropic the Seahorse

Set 21 – May 2012
 Treetops the Gorilla
 Ocean the sea turtle
 Ramble the Centipede
 Shelter the Woodlouse
 Jewel the Corgi

Set 22 – August 2012
 Shield the Armadillo
 Squabble the Pigeon
 Paws the Persian cat
 Pipsqueak the Chihuahua

Limited Edition 13 – November 2012
 Culture the Chameleon

2013
Set 23 – April 2013
 Smoo the Highland Cow
 Comedy the Hyena
 Spirit the Lemur
 Twist the Snake

Set 24 – June 2013
 Scuttle the Crab
 Bixie the Cocker Spaniel
 Flip the Gecko
 Spangle the Starfish

Set 25 – September 2013
 Glide the Pegasus
 Crest the Pterosaur
 Pout the Pufferfish
 Abbey the British Cat

Set 26 – November 2013
 Ziza the African elephant
 Flash the Dragon
 Tinsel the Arctic fox
 Avery the Chick

Set 27 – December 2013
 Aimee the Love Bird
 Pudge the Triceratops
 Leboo the Masai lion
 Deelish the Wombat

2014
Set 28 – March 2014
 Eduardo the Axolotl
 Frizzie the Lamb
 Dash the Cheetah
 Diva the Canary

Set 29 – May 2014
 Pandora the Oyster
 Tatty Puppy
 Denzil the Komodo dragon
 Soprano the Shetland pony

Set 30 – September 2014
 Nelson the Narwhal
 Spartacus the Labradoodle
 China the red panda
 Sahara the Scorpion

Set 31 – November 2014
 Scamp the Gerbil
 Hugo the killer whale
 Sasha the silk moth
 Blanche the Stoat

2015
Set 32 – January 2015
 Tica the tree frog
 Roger the Raccoon
 Snoozi the Sloth
 Stephen the Seagull

Set 33 – March 2015
 Sebastian the Sabre tooth tiger
 Rascal the Schnauzer
 Twinkletoes the Floppy-eared Rabbit
 Pippa the Chipmunk

Set 34 – June 2015
 Spike the Crocodile
 Bobbi the German Shepherd
 Perky the Pangolin
 Claudia the Siamese cat

Set 35 – September 2015
 Chuck the honey badger
 Pizazz the Appaloosa Horse
 Tallulah the King Charles Spaniel
 Ceecee the Shrimp

Set 36 – November 2015
 Sandy the Hermit Crab
 Fudge the Guinea Pig
 Dougie the Markhor
 Betsey the Basset Hound

2016

Set 37 – January 2016
 167 Bubbles the Manta Ray
 164 Felix the Ferret
 166 Dolly the Staffordshire Bull Terrier
 165 Erza the Llama

Set 38 – March 2016
 170 Doris the Slow Loris
 171 George the Silver Fox
 168 Cluck the Chicken 
 169 Rollo the Sugar Glider

Set 39 – June 2016
 175 Zippy the Road Runner
 172 Synthia the Python
 173 Bruce the Gayal
 174 Zzzabella the Queen bee

Set 40 – September 2016
 179 Holly the Magpie
 177 Snowball the Lion-haired rabbit
 178 Jack the Yak
 176 Trixie the Shih Tzu

Set 41 – November 2016
 181 Reggie the Rooster
 183 Winston the British Bulldog
 180 Willow the Wallaby
 182 Annie the Aardvark

2017

My Blue Nose Friends: Series 2
7 new blue nose friends were released in September 2019. These included Toots the Elephant, Konker the Hedgehog, Legend the Unicorn, Blossom the Rabbit, Tiny the Mouse, Milkshake the Cow and Twiggy the Giraffe.

2020
Set 1
 1 Aurora the Caticorn
 2 Rezi the Raccoon
 4 Otto the Octopus
Others
 3 Blossom the Rabbit
 5 Toots the elephant
 6 Lightening the sloth
 7 Twiggy the giraffe
 8 Nala the narwhal
 9 Rufus the dog
 14 Konker the hedgehog
 21 Milkshake the cow
 35 Tiny the mouse
 44 Legend the unicorn

Johan
A 10" snowdear with a blue nose, this character is listed on the my blue nose friends page, although it isn't stated if this is actually a Blue Nose Friend.

Luna the Wolf
To celebrate the launch of their 100th My Blue Nose Friends character, Ramble the Centipede, Carte Blanche launched a free-to-enter competition in June 2012. 100 fans had the chance to win a rare and exclusive 4" My Blue Nose Friends character, Luna the Wolf. The character is not available to buy anywhere in the world.

References

External links 
 

British brands
Teddy bears
Products introduced in 1987